Julienne Paroli (1 August 1882 – 26 September  1959) was a French film actress.

Selected filmography

 Montmartre (1931) - Mme Esther (uncredited)
 Women's Club (1936) - La mère à la gare
 Belle étoile (1938) - (uncredited)
 Three Waltzes (1938) - La mère d'une danseuse (uncredited)
 Grand-père (1939) - Pauline
 Personal Column (1939) - La vieille bonne (uncredited)
 Péchés de jeunesse (1941) - La couturière
 Caprices (1942) - La concierge
 The Blue Veil (1942) - La concierge (uncredited)
 Huit hommes dans un château (1942) - (uncredited)
 Vingt-cinq ans de bonheur (1943) - L'hôtelière
 Shop Girls of Paris (1943) - Une boutiquière (uncredited)
 The Stairs Without End (1943) - Madame Pinchard
 Goodbye Leonard (1943) - (uncredited)
 Love Story (1943) - La vieille Thérèse
 Traveling Light (1944) - La vieille fille
 Cecile Is Dead (1944) - La femme de ménage (uncredited)
 La collection Ménard (1944) - Un amie de la veuve Ménard
 La vie de plaisir (1944) - La comtesse de Merly (uncredited)
 La Grande Meute (1945) - Sylvie
 Majestic Hotel Cellars (1945) - Madame Marcelle, employée aux cuisines (uncredited)
 François Villon (1945) - La mère
 Jericho (1946) - La cliente à la pharmacie (uncredited)
 Land Without Stars (1946) - La grand-mère (uncredited)
 Strange Fate (1946)
 A Lover's Return (1946) - La bonne (uncredited)
 La femme en rouge (1947) - La femme de chambre
 The Lost Village (1947) - Mme Chardon (uncredited)
 La dame d'onze heures (1948) - Une commère (uncredited)
 Tabusse (1949) - La Noémie
 Rendezvous in July (1949) - Minor Role (uncredited)
 Miquette (1950) - Une commère (uncredited)
 Le crime des justes (1950) - La vieille
 A Certain Mister (1950) - La bigote
 On n'aime qu'une fois (1950) - La grand-mère
 ...Sans laisser d'adresse (1951) - Une concierge (uncredited)
 Darling Caroline (1951) - La voisine de la nourrice (uncredited)
 Avalanche (1951) - Mme Coutet
 Deux sous de violettes (1951) - (uncredited)
 The Seven Deadly Sins (1952) - La dame des vestiaires (segment "Orgueil, L' / Pride") (uncredited)
 Monsieur Leguignon Lampiste (1952) - La vieille habitante du quartier (uncredited)
 Le Blé en herbe (1954) - La grand-mère (uncredited)
 La bella Otero (1954) - La bonne de Martel
 Le pain vivant (1955) - La grand-mère
 Les chiffonniers d'Emmaüs (1955) - La bourgeoise (uncredited)
 Le Secret de sœur Angèle (1956) - Une soeur
 Blood to the Head (1956) - Madame Cardinaud - mère
 It's All Adam's Fault (1958)
 Les Misérables (1958) - Madame Magloire
 Le temps des oeufs durs (1958) - La tante de Raoul
 Love Is My Profession (1958) - Mme Blondel - la bijoutière (uncredited) (final film role)

References

Bibliography
 Buache, Freddy. Claude Autant-Lara. L'AGE D'HOMME, 1982.

External links

1882 births
1959 deaths
French film actresses
20th-century French actresses
Actors from Saint-Étienne